Aicama Zorba of La-Susa or Zorba (26 September 1981 – 1992) was a male Old English Mastiff who was recognized by Guinness World Records as the heaviest and longest dog in the world.

Life
Zorba was bred by Mrs I. Prosser on 26 September 1981. His sire and dam were Stablemate's Bruno of Kisumu (American import) and Gildasan Valentine Daisy of Aicama. He was owned by Chris Eraclides of London, England.

World records

In November 1989, Zorba was recorded as weighing . A Saint Bernard named Benedictine has displaced Zorba as the heaviest dog of all time, allegedly weighing .

See also
Giant dog breed
List of individual dogs

References

Individual dogs
1981 animal births
1992 animal deaths
Individual animals in England